Luigi Benedetti (born 19 May 1951, in Massa Carrara) is a former Italian sprinter.

He was twice a finalist with the national relay team on 4x100 metres relay at the Olympic Games (1972 and 1976).

Biography
Luigi Benedetti won four medals with the national relay team at the International athletics competitions. He participated at two editions of the Summer Olympics (1972 and 1976), he has 22 caps in national team from 1971 to 1976.

Olympic results

National titles
In the "Pietro Mennea era", Luigi Benedetti has one win in the individual national championship.
1 win in 100 metres (1973)

See also
Italy national relay team

References

External links
 

Italian male sprinters
Athletes (track and field) at the 1972 Summer Olympics
Athletes (track and field) at the 1976 Summer Olympics
Olympic athletes of Italy
European Athletics Championships medalists
1951 births
Living people
Mediterranean Games silver medalists for Italy
Athletes (track and field) at the 1975 Mediterranean Games
Mediterranean Games medalists in athletics
Universiade medalists in athletics (track and field)
Universiade bronze medalists for Italy
Italian Athletics Championships winners
Medalists at the 1973 Summer Universiade